Galaxy Invader (aka The Galaxy Invader) is a 1985 direct-to-video sci-fi film directed and co-written by Baltimore filmmaker Don Dohler. The film is about an alien who is pursued by hillbillies after his spaceship crash-lands. The cast is made of entirely non-professional actors, mainly friends and family of Dohler. It is featured in Cinematic Titanic: The Complete Collection on disk 5. Segments of the film can also be viewed in the Film Ventures release of the Spanish film Pod People in 1990, however not under legal license from the author. "Pod People" was featured in a segment of Mystery Science Theater 3000 and the unlicensed footage from Galaxy Invader was used.

Plot

When a glowing object, (which seems to be a meteor) careens toward the Earth, a young student, David Harmon (Greg Dohler), who sees it, is narrowly missed as it falls into the forest ahead of him. He calls his old high school teacher, Dr. William Tracy (Dick Dyszel), to tell him about this potential UFO landing. A couple of hours later, a young couple hears a noise in their basement and go down to see what it is. As they slowly descend into the basement, they are terrified and wrestled to the ground by a green monster known as the 'Galaxy Invader'. Joe Montague (Richard Ruxton), is angered by his daughter, Carol (Faye Tilles), at breakfast and chases her through the woods with a gun. After encountering the alien and finding the power source to its weapon, the space ball, Frank Custer (Don Leifert), advises Joe to hunt the alien for a reward. The alien is hunted by a gang of locals led by Montague intent on cashing in on the creature. Joe captures the alien and ties it up in his garage. Dr. Tracy and David  break into the garage and set the alien free. As they flee the garage into the woods, Frank shoots Dr. Tracy. The alien returns and shoots Frank, then Joe shoots the alien and takes back the space gun. Frank's wife comes looking for him at Joe's house and following his history of domestic violence, Joe tries to rape her. In the struggle, Joe shoots Frank's wife using the space gun. Joe's family conspire with Michael Smith (Cliff Lambert), Carol's Boyfriend, to set the alien free and return it home. When they steal the weapons from Joe's sleeping hands, he suddenly wakes and pursues the group with a shotgun. Holding the group and gunpoint, when all hope is lost, the alien appears and attacks Joe. Joe kills the alien using the space gun, but it gives enough time for Michael Smith to get the jump on Joe. A fight ensues and ends with Joe's wife, Ethel (Anne Frith), knocking him off a cliff.

Cast

 Richard Ruxton as Joe Montague
 Faye Tilles as Carol Montague
 George Stover as J.J. Montague
 Greg Dohler as David Harmon
 Anne Frith as Ethel Montague
 Don Leifert as Frank Custer
 Dick Dyszel as Dr. William Tracy
 Theresa Harold as Vickie Johnson
 Glenn Barnes as the alien
 Cliff Lambert as Michael Smith
 Jerry Schuerholz as McGregor
 Paul Wilson as Thompson
 David W. Donoho as Giddings (credited as David Donoho)
 Doug Moran as Turner
 Bunky Hart as Cosco

Production
Galaxy Invader did not have the usual format that Don Dohler employed in many of his B straight-to-VHS films. With a short timeline and limited budget, more emphasis was placed on characters than sci-fi special effects.  The green, web-footed alien monster in the film has a superficial resemblance to the titular entity from Creature from the Black Lagoon. The rubber suit and mask was also unfavorably compared to other film monsters.

The film's cast, however, was part of Don Dohler's stable of friends and includes Donald Leifert and George Stover both featured in Dohler's earlier films, The Alien Factor, Fiend and Nightbeast. Richard Ruxton, another of the film's stars, would go on to star in Dohler's next film, Blood Massacre. Also appearing in a starring role is Dohler's son, Greg Dohler, who plays David Harmon.

Galaxy Invader was shot entirely in and around Baltimore, Maryland, Dohler's hometown. In the introduction, an orchestrated background synthesizer soundtrack was used. In a 10 year period, Dohler shot 4 movies in his hometown on what b-movie connoisseur Joe Bob Briggs termed "25 cent budgets". Every one of Dohler's films had a budget which ranged from as low as $4,000 to as high as $42,000. While "Galaxy Invader" doesn't have an official budget anywhere online, Dohler's website claims it falls somewhere between the stated range. Dohler is known for his low budgets, improvised special effects, and for using a cast of completely non-famous actors.

Footage from this film was used without permission in the introductory and ending credits for the Film Ventures release of the Spanish film Pod People in 1990. Said release in turn was featured as an episode of Mystery Science Theater 3000 the following year.

The body thrown off a cliff at the end of the movie is made of PVC piping.

Reception
In 2009, VideoHound's Golden Movie Retriever gave the movie 1 bone, which in their terms is defined as, "Poor use of camera, film, sets, script, actors, and studio vehicles."

In a 2011 article in The New York Times dealing with 1980s B films, "This pre-video-age late-night cable TV favorite was created (almost singlehandedly) by a fanzine editor who managed to shape his micro-budget into a special effects extravaganza. The late Don Dohler would go on to direct many straight-to-VHS films of the ’80s, including 'Galaxy Invader' and 'Blood Massacre'."

In 2011, RiffTrax, consisting of MST3K alumni Michael J Nelson, Bill Corbett and Kevin Murphy mocked Galaxy Invader.

In 2012, Bleeding Skull! calls it, "Uneventful, but semi-entertaining." "While the somber mood and deeper themes bode well for "Galaxy Invader", the vacant second half drowns everything out."

In 2013, RedLetterMedia called Galaxy Invader "one of our favorite bad movies," praising the film's characters and comparing it favorably to Dohler's earlier film Nightbeast.

References

External links
 

1985 films
Films set in Baltimore
Films shot in Baltimore
1980s science fiction films
Alien visitations in films
Direct-to-video science fiction films
American science fiction films
American exploitation films
1980s English-language films
Films directed by Don Dohler
1980s American films
English-language science fiction films